Townie, eponym of a resident of a town

Townie may refer to:

Places
 Towney Lock, Berkshire, nicknamed "Townie"

People
Townie, as in town and gown, a term commonly used in university towns to refer to residents not affiliated with the university

Arts, entertainment, and media
 "The Townie", Gossip Girl episode
Townie: A Memoir, an autobiography by Andre Dubus III
 Townies, 1996 American situation comedy

Sports
Townie, the mascot for East Providence High School
 The Townies, the nickname of Eastbourne Town F.C.

Transportation
Townie, a type of bicycle
Townie handlebars of bicycles
 Mitsubishi Towny car

See also

Tonie
Tonnie